Israel Antonio Ochoa Plazas (born 26 August 1964) is a Colombian former professional racing cyclist. He was nicknamed El Rápido during his career.

Major results

1991
 1st Stage 6 Clásico RCN
1992
 1st Stage 6 Vuelta al Táchira
1993
 3rd Overall Vuelta a Colombia
1994
 1st Stage 3 Vuelta a Colombia
 1st Stages 5 & 12 Vuelta y Ruta de Mexico
1996
 1st  Overall Clásico RCN
1st Stage 1
1997
 1st  Overall Vuelta a Boyacá
 1st Stage 2 Vuelta a Colombia
1998
 1st Overall Vuelta a Cundinamarca
 1st Stages 3a & 10 Vuelta a Guatemala
 3rd Overall Clásico RCN
1st Prologue (TTT)
 4th Overall Vuelta a Colombia
1999
 3rd Overall Vuelta y Ruta de Mexico
 5th Overall Vuelta a Colombia
1st Stage 13
2000
 National Road Championships
1st  Time trial
2nd Road race
2001
 8th Overall Vuelta a Colombia
2002
 1st Stage 4 Vuelta a Colombia
2003
 2nd Overall Clasica del Meta
1st Stage 3
 1st  Overall Vuelta a Boyacá
1st Stage 5
 3rd Time trial, National Road Championships
 3rd Overall Clásica Nacional Ciudad de Anapoima
 5th Overall Vuelta a Colombia
2004
 National Road Championships
1st  Road race
1st  Time trial
 1st Overall Vuelta a Costa Rica
1st Mountains classification
1st Stage 10
 2nd Overall Doble Copacabana GP Fides
1st Stage 4
2005
 1st Overall GP Mercanapro
1st Stage 1
 1st Stage 3 Clasica del Meta
 2nd Overall Vuelta a Antioquia
1st Stage 4
 3rd Overall Vuelta a Boyacá
1st Stage 4
 4th Overall Doble Copacabana GP Fides
1st Stages 3 (TTT) & 5b Doble Copacabana GP Fides
2006
 1st Overall Vuelta a Boyacá
1st Stage 3
2007
 1st Stages 7 & 8 Clásico RCN
 1st Stage 2 Clásica Club Deportivo Boyacá
 1st Stage 2 Vuelta a los Santanderes
 3rd Time trial, National Road Championships
 3rd Overall Vuelta a Colombia
2008
 National Road Championships
1st  Time trial
2nd Road race
 1st Overall Clásica Aguazul
 3rd Overall Clásica Ciudad de Girardot
1st Stage 1
2009
 1st Overall Clásica Club Deportivo Boyacá
1st Stage 3
 1st Stage 8 Clásico RCN
 1st Stage 3 Vuelta a Santander
 7th Overall Vuelta al Ecuador
1st Stage 8 (ITT)

External links

1964 births
Living people
People from Paipa
Colombian male cyclists
Vuelta Ciclista de Chile stage winners
Vuelta a Colombia stage winners
Sportspeople from Boyacá Department
20th-century Colombian people
21st-century Colombian people